ESD may refer to:

Science 
 ESD (gene), a human gene/enzyme
 Electrostatic discharge, a sudden flow of electricity between two electrically charged objects
 Electrostatic-sensitive device, any component which can be damaged by common static charges
 Energy spectral density, a part of a function in statistical signal processing
 Environmental secondary detector, a gaseous detection device used with environmental scanning electron microscopes
 Equivalent spherical diameter, a diameter of a sphere of equivalent volume
 Extreme subdwarf, a type of star

Medicine 
 End-systolic dimension, the diameter across a ventricle in the heart
 Endoscopic submucosal dissection, a medical therapy with endoscopy

Education 
 Education for sustainable development, international learning methodology
 Educational service district (disambiguation), regional education unit in some U.S. states
 Episcopal School of Dallas, day school in Texas, U.S.
 Evangelical School for the Deaf, in Luquillo, Puerto Rico

Government and law 
 Electronic services delivery, government services provided through the Internet or other electronic means
 Empire State Development Corporation, an American public benefit umbrella organization
 Employment Security Department, a Washington state unemployment agency
 Examination support document, a submission to the United States Patent and Trademark Office

Technology 
 Electronic smoking device, a device that simulates the feeling of smoking
 Electronic software distribution, delivery of digital media content
 Emergency shut down, a valve that stops flow in an emergency
 Engineering Society of Detroit, a multi-disciplinary association in Michigan, U.S.
 Enlightened Sound Daemon, audio software

Transport 
 Elmstead Woods railway station (station code), in London, England
 Esen Air (ICAO airline designator), a defunct airline from Kyrgyzstan
 Expeditionary Transfer Dock, a ship class of the United States Navy
 Orcas Island Airport (IATA code), Eastsound on Orcas Island, Washington, United States

Other uses 
 East Side Digital Records, an American record label
 Eta Sigma Delta, an American honor society